Oued Tlélat is a town and commune in Oran Province, Algeria. According to the 1998 census it has a population of 13289.

References

Communes of Oran Province